One Rathbone Square is a commercial building in London, and the UK headquarters of Facebook.

History
Rathbone Square is a  development in central London. The site was bought from Royal Mail Group for £120m in September 2011; it was the former West End Delivery Office.

Design
Planning consent was granted from Westminster City Council in February 2014. The main architect for the site was Graham Longman; Make Architects were given the project in October 2011.

Construction
Construction began in July 2014, with demolition of the former seven-storey site. Main construction began in 2015.

Structure
It is situated off Oxford Street, in the east of the City of Westminster, and is on the boundary with the London Borough of Camden. It is about 500m south-east of the BT Tower, which can be seen along the neighbouring Rathbone Place. The site costs Facebook £17.8m per year to rent, with a fifteen-year term on the contract.

It features a build called LDN_LAB, a business incubator for tech startup companies.

See also
 Principal Place, Amazon UK headquarters in Shoreditch on Bishopsgate (A10)

References

External links
 Rathbone Square
 LDN_LAB

2017 establishments in England
Buildings and structures in the City of Westminster
Facebook
Frank Gehry buildings
Information technology company headquarters in the United Kingdom
Mass media company headquarters in the United Kingdom
Office buildings completed in 2017
Office buildings in London